Three Floors is a 2021 Italian drama film co-produced, co-written and directed by Nanni Moretti. It is based on the 2017 novel Shalosh Qomot by Israeli writer Eshkol Nevo, moving the setting from Tel Aviv to Rome, and also marking Moretti's first adaptation of the work of another artist.

It stars Margherita Buy, Riccardo Scamarcio, Alba Rohrwacher, Adriano Giannini, Elena Lietti, Alessandro Sperduti, Denise Tantucci and Moretti. It had its world premiere at the 74th Cannes Film Festival on 11 July 2021. It is scheduled to be released in Italy on 23 September 2021 by 01 Distribution.

Plot
The story of three families living on different floors of the same middle-class apartment building.

Cast

Production
The shooting began on 4 March 2019 in Rome and lasted until May.

Reception
Three Floors had its world premiere at the 2021 Cannes Film Festival where it received a standing ovation of eleven minutes. The film was screened as a special presentation at the 2021 Toronto International Film Festival.

References

External links

2021 drama films
Films about families
Films based on Israeli novels
Films directed by Nanni Moretti
Films set in Rome
Films shot in Rome
French drama films
Italian drama films
2020s Italian-language films
2020s French films
2020s Italian films
Rai Cinema films
Fandango (Italian company) films